Narva Ice Hall (also Kreenholm Ice Hall) is an ice arena in Narva, Estonia.

The hall was opened in 2003.

The hall's capacity is 1500.

The hall has an ice arena with dimensions of 30 x 60 m.

The hall is used the ice hockey clubs Narva PSK.

References

Indoor arenas in Estonia
Sport in Narva
Indoor ice hockey venues in Estonia
Buildings and structures in Narva